Vagner Pereira Costa (born 1 June 1987 in Ourinhos) is a Brazilian footballer.

Career 
Vagner began his career with União Barbarense and in spring 2006 he joined Darida. In January 2008 he moved to with Granit Mikashevichi.

Honors
Ordabasy
Kazakhstan Cup (1): 2011

References

External links
 
 
 

1987 births
Living people
People from Ourinhos
Brazilian footballers
Association football midfielders
Brazilian expatriate footballers
Expatriate footballers in Belarus
Expatriate footballers in Kazakhstan
Expatriate footballers in Malta
União Agrícola Barbarense Futebol Clube players
FC Darida Minsk Raion players
FC Granit Mikashevichi players
FC Ordabasy players
FC Kaisar players
Bangu Atlético Clube players
Desportiva Ferroviária players
Mqabba F.C. players
Footballers from São Paulo (state)